Dali is a town under the administration of Shunchang County, Fujian, China. , it administers Dali Residential Community and the following eight villages:
Dali Village
Xiadian Village
Xiuwu Village
Lidun Village
Longtou Village
Xiakeng Village
Tianhou Village
Qianyang Village

References 

Township-level divisions of Fujian
Shunchang County